Insanitarium  is a 2008 American direct-to-video horror-thriller film starring Jesse Metcalfe, Kiele Sanchez, Kevin Sussman, Olivia Munn, Carla Gallo and Peter Stormare. The film is directed by Jeff Buhler.

Plot
The film follows a man, Jack (Jesse Metcalfe), faking insanity in order to save his sister, Lily (Kiele Sanchez), who has been involuntarily institutionalized. The siblings soon find that the strange doctor at the asylum, Mr. Gianetti (Peter Stormare), has been testing an experimental compound, orphium, on the patients that seems to be turning them into flesh-eating zombies; Loomis (Kurt Caceres), another patient, spreads the infection.  The two siblings band together with a terminally paranoid man, Dave (Kevin Sussman), and a helpful nurse, Nancy (Olivia Munn), in the hopes of finding a way out of the asylum.  They are attacked by most of the prisoners and staff, who kill Nancy; while on the 4th floor, they encounter the doctor, who gives Dave an icepick lobotomy, incapacitating him; he attempts to get Jack too, but ends up being infected by Loomis. At the end of the film, as the two siblings are in a police car heading to the asylum to investigate, the officers (Mark Kelly & Sharon Schaffer) accidentally let the patients escape into the outside world. It ends with a panning shot, revealing the city below the asylum's hillside location.
The secondary plot focuses on the affair between Charles (Evan Parke) and Heather (Lisa Arturo).

Cast

Production
The film was shot during August/September 2007 with the majority of filming taking place at the abandoned RFK Memorial Hospital in Hawthorne, California.  The "maximum security" set and the "laundry chute" were both constructed from scratch on site in an empty wing of the hospital.

Mathew Mungle Creations, the same special effects company that supplied the notorious effects for the Jeff Buhler written Midnight Meat Train, also supplied the special effects for Insanitarium.  Nearly everything was done using practical effects and prosthetics with very little contribution from CGI, including the decapitation of a fake cat.

Stormare improvised many parts of his role, including the "panties in the mouth" scene with Carla Gallo, who plays Vera, his research assistant. She comments on this scene in the behind the scenes DVD extras.

External links

References

2008 horror films
American zombie films
Films set in psychiatric hospitals
Hawthorne, California
2008 films
Screen Gems films
Stage 6 Films films
Films produced by Mason Novick
Direct-to-video horror films
2000s English-language films
2000s American films